The following list consists of concepts that are derived from both Christian and Arab tradition, which are expressed as words and phrases in the Arabic language.  These terms are included as transliterations, often accompanied by the original Arabic-alphabet orthography. Although Islam is the dominant religion among Arabs, there are a significant number of Arab Christians in regions that were formerly Christian, such as much of the Byzantine empire's lands in the Middle East, so that there are over twenty million Arab Christians living around the world.  (Significant populations in Egypt, Lebanon, Brazil, Mexico, Jordan, Syria, Palestine, Sudan, Iraq, USA, Canada, UK and Australia.)  Christianity has existed in the Arab world since the 1st century. Arabic is written with the Arabic alphabet, and different individuals and Christian groups may transliterate certain Arabic words into the Latin alphabet in various ways.



A
 al-Āb (الآبُ)  God the Father
 al-ʿAhd al-Qadīm (اَلْعَهْد اَلْقَدِيم)  Old Testament
 al-ʿAhd al-Jadīd (اَلْعَهْد اَلْجَدِيد)  New Testament
 Allāh (الله)  literally "God"; is also used as a religious term by Arab Muslims and Arab Jews (Jews who speak Arabic use it mostly within their daily discussions, but not within their religious services, which are said in Hebrew).
Roman Catholics in Malta call God Alla in the Maltese language. The name Allah is also used by Christians in predominantly Islamic countries and countries where both faiths exist side by side regularly such as Indonesia, Malaysia, Lebanon, Turkey, Syria, Egypt, Iraq, etc. 
 Aiqūna (أَيْقونة)  Icon
 As-salamu alaykum (لسَّلَامُ لَيْكُمْ)  is a greeting in Arabic that means "Peace be upon you". The salam is a religious salutation among Muslims and also uses of Arab Christians replacing Shalom in Hebrew language for Arabs ethnics who speak Arabic language as official language of Arabs.

B
 Bābā (بَابَا)  Pope
 Bābā Nuwayl (بَابَا نُوِيل)  Santa Claus (from French "Papa Noël")
 Bismi l-Ābi wa l-Ibni wa r-Rūḥi l-Qudus (بِاسْمِ الآبِ وَالاِبْنِ وَالرُّوحِ الْقُدُسِ, also spelled بِسْمِ الآبِ وَالاِبْنِ وَالرُّوحِ الْقُدُسِ) "In the name of the Father, the Son and the Holy Spirit" (See also: Trinitarian formula, Basmala).   Sometimes followed by ألإلهِ الْوَاحِد al-Ilāhi l-Wāḥid "The One God", to emphasize monotheism.
 Brūtistāntī (بْرُوتِسْتَانْتِي)  Protestant (a more foreign-imitating pronunciation is Prōtistāntī)

I
 ‘Īdu Jamī‘il-Qiddīsīn (عِيدُ جَمِيعِ الْقِدِّيسِين)  All Saints' Day
 ‘Īdu l-‘Anṣarah (عِيدُ الْعَنْصَرَة)  Pentecost
 ‘Īd al-Burbāra (عيد البربارة)  Literally "the Feast of Barbara". It is the equivalent of Halloween for the Middle Eastern Christians (who generally do not celebrate said holiday), although it is held on 4 December.
 ‘Īdu l-Fiṣḥ (عِيدُ الْفِصْح) or ‘Īdu l-Qiyāmah (عِيدُ الْقِيامَة) literally "the Feast of Pesach/Passover" or "Feast of the Resurrection" - Easter
 ‘Īdu l-Jasad (عِيدُ ْالجَسَد)  The Catholic feast of Corpus Christi
 ‘Īdu l-Mīlād (عِيدُ الْمِيلاد)  literally "Feast of the Nativity" - Christmas
 ‘Īdu ṣ-Ṣu‘ūd (‘Īdu Ṣu‘ūdil-Masīḥ) (عِيدُ الصُّعُود)  Feast of the Ascension
 Sabtu l-Amwāt (سَبْتُ الأَمْوَات)  literally "Sabbath of the Dead" - All Soul's Day
 Injīl (إنجيل)   One of the four gospels (from Greek Ευαγγελια "Good News"); Muslims use it in the original sense as the message of Jesus, either only orally transmitted or recorded in a hypothetical scripture, like the Torah and the Quran, containing God's revelations to Jesus. According to them, the gospels partially contain the revealed words or are corrupted copies of the hypothetical original.
 Intiqāl al-ʿAḏrā (انتقال العذراء)  Assumption of Mary (literally: "Assumption of the Virgin")

K
 Kanīsa (كَنِيسة)  Church, similar to the Hebrew Knesset literally "Assembly". See Alcañiz for a Spanish cognate through Mozarabic.
 Kārdināl (كاردينال)  Cardinal
 Kathūlīkī (كَاثُولِيكِيّ)  Catholic
 Kātidrā'iyyah (كَاتِدْرَائِيَّة)  Cathedral
 al-Kitāb al-Muqaddas (اَلْكِتَاب اَلْمُقَدَّس)  Bible (literally "the Holy Scriptures")

M
 Maryamu l-‘Adhra' (مَرْيَمُ الْعَذْرَاء) Virgin Mary
 al-Masīḥ (أَلْمَسِيح) Christ or Messiah
 al-Masīḥiyyah (أَلْمَسِيحِيَّة) Christianity
 Masīḥī (مَسِيحِيّ) Christian (literally "Messianic")
 al-Mazmur (اَلْمَزْمُوْر) Psalms
 Mubaššir (مُبَشِّر) Christian missionary (positive sense, literally means "carrier of good news")
 Munaṣṣir (مُنَصِّر ) Christian missionary (neutral sense, literally "Christianizer")

N
 an-Naṣīra (اَلنَّاصِرَة)  Nazareth
 Naṣrānī (نَصْرَانِيّ) A traditional Islamic term for Christians (literally "Nazarene"). Arab Christians do not use it to refer to themselves. It can have a negative connotation in some contexts.
 Nāṣirī (نَاصِرِيّ)  Person from Nazareth (also a follower of Gamal Abdel Nasser)

O
 Orthodhoksiyya (أُرْثُوذُكْسِيّة) Orthodox Christianity

 Orthodhoksī (أُرْثُوذُكْسِيّ) Orthodox Christian

Q
 Qibti, Qubti (قُبْطِيّ)  Coptic

 Quddās (قداس)  Mass

 Qiddīs, Muqaddas (قديس - مقدس )  Saint, holy, sacred

R
 ar-Rūḥu l-Qudus (الرُّوحُ الْقُدُسُ) The Holy Spirit
 Ruqād as-Sayyida al-ʿAḏrāʾ (رقاد السيّدة العذراء) the Dormition of the Mother of God

S
 Ṣalīb (صليب) Cross
 Šahīd (شهيد)  Martyr (The same term is used in Islamic terminology for the "martyrs of Islam", but the meaning is different) literal meaning of the word shahid is "witness" i.e. witness of god/believer in God.
 Sim‘ānu l-Ghayūr (سِمْعَانُ الْغَيُور) Simon the Zealot
 Sim‘ānu Butrus (سِمْعَانُ بطرس) Simon Peter

T
 Tabšīr  literally "the Spreading of Good News" - Christian missionary work
 Talāmīḏ al-Masīḥ  The Twelve Apostles (literally "Disciples of the Messiah")
 Tanṣīr or Ta‘mīd ( or )  literally "making someone Naṣrānī i.e. Christian, or baptizing him/her" -  To confer the Christian Sacrament(or Mystery) of Baptism سر العماد أو المعمودية Sirr al-‘imād or al-ma‘mūdiyyah.
 Tajassud  Incarnation (of Jesus Christ)
 ath-Thālūth  The Holy Trinity
 Tawbah Repentance

U
 Ūrasalīm (أُورَسلِيم)   Arabic transliteration from Hebrew of Jerusalem (as opposed to the mostly secular Arabic term al-Quds أَلْقُدْس).  Also the official Arabic name for Jerusalem used by the Israeli government.

 Ūsquf (أُسْقُف)  Bishop (pl. أَسَاقِفَة), Archbishop (رَئِيسُ الْأَسَاقِفَة)

Y
 Yasū‘ (يَسُوعَ)  Christian Arabic version of the name of Jesus (as opposed to the Islamic Arabic term Isa عيسى)
 Yasū‘u l-Masīḥ (يَسُوعُ المسيح)  Jesus Christ (literally "Jesus the Messiah")
 al-Jum‘atu l-Ḥazīna (أَلْجُمْعَةُ الْحَزيِنَة) Good Friday Popular usage (literally "Sad Friday")
 al-Jum‘atu l-‘Aẓīma (أَلْجُمْعَةُ الْعَظِيمَة) Good Friday Official usage (literally "Great Friday")
 Yahūḏā al-Isḫaryūṭī (يهوذا الإسخريوطي)  Judas Iscariot
 Yuḥanna (يُوحَنَّا) Christian Arabic version of the name of John (as opposed to the Islamic Arabic term Yaḥya يَحْيَى)

Z
 Zabūr (زَبُور)  The Psalms, in Islam referred to as Zabur, a holy book revealed by God to David. The Christian term is Mazāmīr مزامير; singular mazmūr مزمور.

See also 

 Glossary of Islam
 Bible translations into Arabic

External links 

 Arabic Christian literature
 American Middle East Christians Congress

Christian terminology
Arabic words and phrases
Christianity in the Arab world